Maryland's Legislative District 19 is one of 47 districts in the state for the Maryland General Assembly. The district currently consists of several Montgomery County communities, including portions of Laytonsville, Redland, Derwood, Shady Grove, Olney, Norbeck, Norwood, Leisure World, Aspen Hill, Layhill, Glenmont, Wheaton, Kemp Mill, and Four Corners.

Demographic characteristics
As of the 2020 United States census, the district had a population of 130,865, of whom 101,851 (77.8%) were of voting age. The racial makeup of the district was 50,940 (38.9%) White, 24,741 (18.9%) African American, 1,005 (0.8%) Native American, 17,246 (13.2%) Asian, 37 (0.0%) Pacific Islander, 20,162 (15.4%) from some other race, and 16,719 (12.8%) from two or more races. Hispanic or Latino of any race were 34,762 (26.6%) of the population.

The district had 82,913 registered voters as of October 17, 2020, of whom 17,581 (21.2%) were registered as unaffiliated, 14,123 (17.0%) were registered as Republicans, 50,079 (60.4%) were registered as Democrats, and 711 (0.9%) were registered to other parties.

Political representation
The district is represented for the 2023–2027 legislative term in the State Senate by Benjamin F. Kramer (D) and in the House of Delegates by Bonnie Cullison (D), Vaughn Stewart (D), and Charlotte Crutchfield (D).

References

Montgomery County, Maryland
19
19